Muak Sa-aak (autonym: mùak sɤ́ʔàak, meaning 'mountain slope') is an Angkuic language spoken in the Burma-China border region by over 4,000 people.

Demographics
There are some 4,460 Muak Sa-aak in Burma and China. Muak Sa-aak speakers are located primarily in Mong Yawng Township, Shan State, Burma (Hall 2010:4). There are at least 2 villages in China, with speakers possibly located in Thailand as well, though it would be nearly extinct there (Hall 2010).

Hall (2010) analyzes phonological data from the Muak Sa-aak village of Wan Fai, eastern Shan State, Burma, which has 620 people and is located very close to the Chinese border.

References

Further reading
Hall, Elizabeth. 2010. A Phonology of Muak Sa-aak. M.A. thesis. Chiang Mai, Thailand: Payap University.
Journal articles
Hall, Elizabeth. 2014. Impact of Tai Lue on Muak Sa-aak phonology. Mon-Khmer Studies Journal vol. 43.1:24–30.
Hall, Elizabeth. 2014. An Analysis of Muak Sa-aak Tone. JSEALS vol. 7:1-10.
Hall, Elizabeth. 2013. A phonological description of Muak Sa-aak. Mon-Khmer Studies Journal vol. 42:26-39

Palaungic languages